Claudin-12 is a protein that in humans is encoded by the CLDN12 gene. It belongs to the group of claudins.

References

External links

Further reading